Aleksi-Meskhishvili is a famous Georgian surname of the calligraphers and painters. It may refer to:

 Barbara Aleksi-Meskhishvili, Soviet-era stage actress
 Georgi Aleksi-Meskhishvili, set designer and artist
 Lado Aleksi-Meskhishvili, stage actor and director
 Nino Aleksi-Meskhishvili, Soviet-era stage actor
 Sardion Aleksi-Meskhishvili, doctor and translator
 Shalva Aleksi-Meskhishvili, jurist and politician
 Vladimir Aleksi-Meskhishvili, award-winning architect

Georgian-language surnames
Compound surnames